80 Fetter Lane is a Grade II listed building at 78–81 Fetter Lane, London. The building was designed by architects Treadwell & Martin for Buchanan's Distillery.

References

External links

http://www.victorianweb.org/sculpture/daymond/1.html
http://ornamentalpassions.blogspot.co.uk/2010/01/80-fetter-lane-ec4.html

Grade II listed buildings in the City of London